Events in the year 1965 in Portugal.

Incumbents
President: Américo Tomás
Prime Minister: António de Oliveira Salazar

Events
15 September - Harry Reedman arrives in Lisbon to set up the Rhodesian mission there.
7 November – Portuguese legislative election, 1965.
Portuguese presidential election, 1965

Arts and entertainment
20 March - "Sol de inverno", performed by Simone de Oliveira, Portugal's entry in the Eurovision Song Contest held in Naples, finishes twelfth.

Sports
C.D. Mafra founded
Vieira S.C. founded

Births
27 February - Pedro Chaves, racing driver
23 March - José Leal, footballer
27 March - Francisco Ribeiro, musician and composer (Madredeus) (d. 2010)
26 September - Alexandra Lencastre, actress
24 November - Rui Barros, footballer
24 December - Mafalda Veiga, singer-songwriter
date unknown - Alexandre Delgado, composer

Deaths

13 February - Humberto Delgado, military leader and politician (born 1906); assassinated
11 June – José Mendes Cabeçadas, military officer and politician (born 1883)

References

 
1960s in Portugal
Portugal
Years of the 20th century in Portugal
Portugal